CBR is a Canadian clear-channel radio station, broadcasting at 1010 kHz in Calgary, Alberta. It broadcasts the programming of the CBC Radio One network. CBR's studios are located in the Parkdale neighbourhood of northwest Calgary, while its transmitters are located in southeast Calgary.

CBR's daytime signal covers most of the southern two-thirds of Alberta. It can be heard at city-grade strength from Red Deer to Lethbridge, and provides secondary coverage as far as Edmonton to the north and several counties on the Montana-Alberta border to the south. At night, it covers most of western North America.

As of Winter 2020, CBR was the 2nd-most-listened-to radio station in the Calgary market according to Numeris.

History
The origin of CBR began on September 8, 1948 when CBX, with studios in Edmonton, started broadcasting on 1010 kHz from a site near Lacombe, roughly halfway between Calgary and Edmonton, in an attempt to serve both cities from a single 50,000-watt transmitter. 

From early on, however, reception of CBX in Calgary was poor. To rectify this ongoing issue, on October 1, 1964, the original CBX transmitter was decommissioned and the single station was split into two distinct 50,000-watt stations with their own studios: one transmitting near Edmonton and one transmitting near Calgary. 

The Edmonton station kept the CBX call sign but moved to a frequency of 740 kHz, while the Calgary station obtained the CBR call sign but kept CBX's former frequency of 1010 kHz and clear-channel designation.

Prior to CBR's sign-on, private station CFAC had aired CBC radio programming.

On March 16, 2006, the Canadian Radio-television and Telecommunications Commission (CRTC) approved an application by the station to implement a new, nested FM transmitter in Calgary itself to simulcast the AM programming, due to the AM signal's poor reception in some parts of the city. This new FM signal, CBR-1-FM 99.1 was launched on November 28, 2006. In recent years, the CBC has branded 99.1 as the main transmitter, even though 1010 is technically the main station.

Various other AM and FM rebroadcasters have been installed throughout southern Alberta.

On December 19, 2008, the licensee proposes to use a Subsidiary communications authority (SCA) channel to broadcast multi-cultural programs.

On July 7, 2011, the CRTC approved an application by the CBC to relocate CBR's transmitter. All other technical parameters will remain unchanged.

Local programming
CBR's local programs are Calgary Eyeopener in the morning, and The Homestretch in the afternoon.

Transmitters

In 1993, the CRTC approved the CBC's application to operate new FM transmitters at Medicine Hat 98.3 MHz and Etzikom 92.1 MHz. The new FM transmitter at Medicine Hat would replace CJMH the existing AM transmitter 1460 kHz owned by Monarch Broadcasting Ltd. Monarch would surrender the license of CJMH once the new transmitters were in operation.

On April 30, 2015, the CBC submitted an application to add a new FM transmitter in Lake Louise with the call sign CBRQ-FM. If approved, the new transmitter would operate at 103.9 MHz to rebroadcast CBR. A transmitter currently listed at 103.9 MHz in Lake Louise. The transmitter was owned by the Lake Louise Community Association. The CRTC approved the CBC's application to operate a CBC Radio One transmitter at Lake Louise on July 14, 2015.

References

External links
 CBC Calgary
 CBR history - Canadian Communications Foundation
 
 

BR
BR
Radio stations established in 1964
1964 establishments in Alberta
Clear-channel radio stations